General della Rovere is a 1959 Italian film directed by Roberto Rossellini. The film is based on a novel by Indro Montanelli which was in turn based on a true story.

Plot

Genoa, 1944, during the era of the Italian Social Republic. Petty thief Emanuele Bardone (played by Vittorio De Sica) is hired by the Third Reich to impersonate an Italian resistance leader, General Della Rovere, and infiltrate a group of resistance prisoners in a Milan prison.  Gradually, Bardone loses himself in his role and not merely pretends to be a hero of the resistance but actually becomes one, first encouraging his fellow prisoners to show courage and eventually accepting death by firing squad rather than betraying another imprisoned resistance leader.

Cast
Vittorio De Sica: Vittorio Emanuele Bardone/Grimaldi
Hannes Messemer: SS Col. Müller
Vittorio Caprioli: Aristide Banchelli
Sandra Milo: Olga
Giovanna Ralli: Valeria
Maria Greco: Madama Vera
Herbert Fischer: German sergeant
Anne Vernon: Clara Fassio
Franco Interlenghi: Antonio Pasquali
Ivo Garrani: Partisan Chief
Linda Veras: German Attendant

Awards
The film won the Golden Lion at the Venice Film Festival.

Cultural influences
The transformation of Emmanuele Bardone, the film's protagonist, from an Axis collaborator into a hero of the anti-national socialist resistance, has been compared by Spanish political commentators to the life story of Adolfo Suárez, the Spanish prime minister who oversaw the transition to democracy in the late 1970s.  In particular, Javier Cercas devotes the last chapter of The Anatomy of a Moment to exploring the parallels between Bardone and Suarez.

References

External links
 
 
 

1959 films
1950s war drama films
Italian war drama films
1950s Italian-language films
1950s German-language films
French black-and-white films
Italian Campaign of World War II films
Films about Italian resistance movement
World War II films based on actual events
Films based on Italian novels
Golden Lion winners
Films directed by Roberto Rossellini
Films set in Genoa
Films set in 1944
1959 drama films
Films scored by Renzo Rossellini
French World War II films
Italian World War II films
1950s Italian films
1950s French films
1950s multilingual films
French multilingual films
Italian multilingual films
French-language Italian films
Italian-language French films